Dai Hakken (大発見; literally great discovery) is the fifth studio album by Japanese rock band Tokyo Jihen, released on June 29, 2011 in Japan through EMI Music Japan and Virgin Music. The album was produced by the band and Japanese recording engineer Uni Inoue.

Background 
In this album, the characters making up the song titles are aligned in all songs except for the additional English words in the first and last song as well as the additional seven characters on track 7. Ringo Sheena's tradition of symmetrically matching song titles written in Kanji, Hiragana and Latin characters throughout the album, however, was broken for this record.
Some of titles of the official European language were named for a movie (especially French movie).

Track listing
Credits adapted from Ringo Sheena's website.

Charts and certifications

Charts

Sales and certifications

Notes and references

External links 
Tokyo Jihen Discography

Tokyo Jihen albums
2011 albums